A-flat may refer to:

A, a musical pitch
A scale based on A-flat:
 A-flat major
A-flat minor
A Flat (film), a 2010 Hindi film
 "A Flat", a song by Staind from Dysfunction

See also
Flat A